In enzymology, an adenosylcobinamide-phosphate guanylyltransferase is an enzyme that catalyzes the chemical reaction

GTP + adenosylcobinamide phosphate  diphosphate + adenosylcobinamide-GDP

The two substrates of this enzyme are GTP and adenosylcobinamide phosphate; its two products are diphosphate and adenosylcobinamide-GDP.

This enzyme belongs to the family of transferases, specifically those transferring phosphorus-containing nucleotide groups (nucleotidyltransferases).  The systematic name of this enzyme class is GTP:adenosylcobinamide-phosphate guanylyltransferase. Other names in common use include CobU, adenosylcobinamide kinase/adenosylcobinamide-phosphate, guanylyltransferase, and AdoCbi kinase/AdoCbi-phosphate guanylyltransferase. This enzyme is part of the biosynthetic pathway to cobalamin (vitamin B12) in bacteria.

See also
 Cobalamin biosynthesis

References

 
 
 
 
 

EC 2.7.7
Enzymes of unknown structure